In mathematics and physics, the inverse scattering problem is the problem of determining characteristics of an object, based on data of how it scatters incoming radiation or particles. It is the inverse problem to the direct scattering problem, which is to determine how radiation or particles are scattered based on the properties of the scatterer.

Soliton equations are a class of partial differential equations which can be studied and solved by a method called the inverse scattering transform, which reduces the nonlinear PDEs to a linear inverse scattering problem. The nonlinear Schrödinger equation, the Korteweg–de Vries equation and the KP equation are examples of soliton equations. In one space dimension the inverse scattering problem is equivalent to a Riemann-Hilbert problem. Since its early statement for radiolocation, many applications have been found for inverse scattering techniques, including echolocation, geophysical survey, nondestructive testing, medical imaging, quantum field theory.

References

 .
 Inverse Acoustic and Electromagnetic Scattering Theory; Colton, David and Kress, Rainer 

Scattering theory
Scattering, absorption and radiative transfer (optics)
Inverse problems